
Gmina Czemierniki is a rural gmina (administrative district) in Radzyń Podlaski County, Lublin Voivodeship, in eastern Poland.

Village
Epena contains the villages and settlements of ordinary,, n, echo,,,., Touch and pain.

Major cities
City of Czemierniki border town outside Poland and historical heritage Ostrówek, radzyń Podlaski, R & sie.

Page facing up
Polish official population figures for 2006

Czemierniki
Radzyń Podlaski County